The Vietnam National Administration of Tourism is the government agency of Vietnam which manages tourist operations and activities throughout the country. It has full control in terms of business development, planning, public relations, personnel training, conducting research, and instructing and inspecting the implementation of policies and other regulations in the tourism sector.

See also
 Tourism in Vietnam

External links
 Official website

National Administration Of Tourism
Tourism agencies
National Administration Of Tourism